Baby Bedtime is a 2013 children's picture book by Mem Fox and illustrated by Emma Quay. The book, published in America by Beach Lane Books, and published in Australia by Penguin Books Australia, is about an adult elephant getting her baby ready for bed.

Publication history
 2014, USA, Beach Lane Books 
 There Comes A Time For Sleeping, 2013, England, Penguin Books 
 2013, Australia, Penguin Books Australia

Reception
Reviews of Baby Bedtime have been mixed. A Kirkus Reviews reviewer was especially concerned with the book's initial wording and wrote that "the cannibalistic opening quatrain followed by a gushingly affectionate outpouring makes for a book that only a certain type of grandparent could read aloud to a very young grandchild. Quay's striking illustrations cannot rescue this one". Publishers Weekly wrote: "Here's a wonderful little lesson in the subjunctive from master teacher Fox (Ten Little Fingers and Ten Little Toes). ... After a few pages of soft-crayoned textures, pastel hues, and arm's-length framing, a visual sameness sets in, though readers should find it soporific".

There have also been Baby Bedtime reviews in Booklist, School Library Journal, The Horn Book Magazine, The Bulletin of the Center for Children's Books, Reading Time, Scan, and Magpies.

Awards
 2015 CCBC Choices book
 2014 CBCA Book of the Year: Early Childhood shortlist
 2014 CBCA Picture Book of the Year notable book
 2014 Speech Pathology Australia Book of the Year Awards, Birth to three years shortlist
 2014 Western Australian Premier's Book Awards shortlist

References

External links

 Library holdings of Baby Bedtime
 Library holdings of There Comes A Time For Sleeping

Australian picture books
2013 children's books
Picture books by Mem Fox
Sleep in fiction